Omar da Fonseca (born 20 October 1959 is an Argentine football commentator and former player.

Personal life 
Born in Argentina, da Fonseca is a naturalized citizen of France.

References

External links
Omar da Fonseca at BDFA.com.ar 
Profile 

1947 births
Living people
Footballers from Buenos Aires
Argentine footballers
French people of Argentine descent
Sportspeople of Argentine descent
Argentine expatriate footballers
Association football forwards
Club Atlético Belgrano footballers
Club Atlético Vélez Sarsfield footballers
 Paris FC players
Tours FC players
Paris Saint-Germain F.C. players
AS Monaco FC players
Toulouse FC players
Expatriate footballers in Monaco
Argentine Primera División players
Ligue 1 players
Ligue 2 players
Argentine expatriate sportspeople in Monaco
Naturalized citizens of France
Association football commentators
Argentine emigrants to France